Almir Barbosa (born June 2, 1980) is a Cape Verdean footballer.

Career

College and Amateur
Born in Cape Verde, Barbosa spent his early childhood in Portugal, before moving to Quincy, Massachusetts, in the United States aged 15. He played for the Massachusetts-based Cape Verdean ethnic Fidjus Terra, Alianca CV, and Clube Tabanka, and played college soccer at the University of South Carolina Spartanburg, where he was a National Soccer Coaches Athletic Association All-American in 2000 and received All-Conference honors in 2003.

Professional
Barbosa turned professional in 2004, and began his career in the USL Second Division, then moving to Sweden, playing for Kristianstads FF, before returning to the United States when he signed for the New Hampshire Phantoms in the USL Second Division in 2006. Barbosa was named to the USL Division 2 All-League First Team and tied for second in the league in scoring with 10 goals in his debut season with the Phantoms.

Barbosa moved to the Harrisburg City Islanders in 2008 making 16 appearances, following the Phantoms' relegation to the USL Premier Development League, and spent one year in Pennsylvania before signing for the Western Mass Pioneers in 2009. He played 19 games and scored 9 goals for the Pioneers in USL-2 in 2009. Barbosa was named to the USL Division 2 All-League Team, but was released at the end of the year when the Pioneers also self-relegated to the PDL. Barbosa, also had the honor of being selected as one of USL's Division 2 player of the decade.

Having been unable to secure a professional contract elsewhere, Barbosa returned to play for the New Hampshire Phantoms in the USL Premier Development League in 2010.

References

External links
Pioneers bio

1980 births
Living people
Sportspeople from Praia
Cape Verdean footballers
Association football forwards
Penn FC players
Seacoast United Phantoms players
USL Second Division players
Western Mass Pioneers players
USL League Two players
Cape Verdean emigrants to the United States
Cape Verdean expatriate footballers
Expatriate footballers in Sweden
Cape Verdean expatriate sportspeople in Sweden
Rhode Island Stingrays players
USC Upstate Spartans men's soccer players